Michael Cretu (born 18 May 1957) is a Romanian-German musician, singer, songwriter, and record producer. He gained worldwide fame as the founder and musician behind the musical project Enigma, which he formed in 1990.

Cretu began a music career in 1976 as a solo artist and released numerous studio albums as well as writing and producing albums for his then-wife, German pop singer Sandra. He also worked with artists through the 1980s, including Peter Cornelius, Hubert Kah, and Mike Oldfield. Cretu was sometimes identified as "Curly" or "Curly M.C.", in reference to his curly hair and creț meaning "curly" in Romanian.

Cretu scored an unexpected worldwide commercial hit with the debut Enigma album MCMXC a.D. (1990), helped by its lead single, "Sadeness (Part I)". Cretu continues to produce Enigma albums and singles; the most recent is The Fall of a Rebel Angel (2016), its eighth overall. Enigma has sold an estimated 70 million albums worldwide, Cretu's management company Crocodile-Music stated that Cretu's produced recordings have sold 100 million copies worldwide.

Early life
Cretu was born on 18 May 1957 in Bucharest, Romanian People's Republic, to a Romanian father and Austrian mother. In 1965, he studied the piano and classical music at Colegiul Tehnic Nr. 2 in Bucharest, followed by further study in Paris for five months in 1968. Around this time, Cretu wished to pursue a career in pop music after listening to "Golden Slumbers" on Abbey Road (1969) by The Beatles, calling the song "beautiful". After he informed his mother, Cretu recalled: "She goes, 'Aaargh! Disaster! Do you want to end up starving?'" In 1975, Cretu relocated to Bad Homburg, Germany and studied at the Academy of Music in Frankfurt, where he graduated with a degree in musical composition in 1978. Cretu went on to speak four languages.

Career

1976–1988: Solo career, producer, and early bands
After graduating from the Academy of Music, Cretu remained in Germany and took up work as a session musician. Among Cretu's first jobs was being taken on as keyboardist and producer for German recording artist Frank Farian, and playing keyboards on "Rivers of Babylon" by Boney M. In 1981, Cretu co-formed the German new wave band Moti Special with other session players. Their debut album Motivation (1985) contained the single "Cold Days, Hot Nights" which became a hit around Europe. Cretu left the group before they released their second album in 1990.

Cretu's first solo album was released in 1979, titled Moon, Light & Flowers. It contains the singles "Shadows Over My Head" and "Wild River" released in 1978, and "Moonlight Flower" and "Love Me" (the latter two singles became popular hits in the Philippines) from 1979. His second album, Legionäre, was released in 1983 and features German lyrics sung by him. Cretu's third solo album was titled Die Chinesische Mauer and was released in 1985. The literal English translation is The Chinese Wall. As with the second album, it features German lyrics sung by Cretu and is co-produced by Armand Volker. This album was also released as a separate album with English-language lyrics and a different track listing under the name The Invisible Man. Several of the tracks on The Invisible Man were edited slightly and, therefore, had different lengths than the German-language versions on Die Chinesische Mauer. This featured the song "Samurai", which became a hit.

In 1985, Cretu produced, arranged, and played the keyboards, drums, and programming on The Long Play (1985), the first studio album from German pop singer Sandra. The two began a relationship, and were married in 1988.

In the 1980s, Cretu took over production for the pop quartet Hubert Kah and started writing songs with the band leader Hubert Kemmler, achieving a number of hits. Among his other work, Cretu was also one of the producers of Mike Oldfield's 1987 album Islands and the producer of Peter Schilling's 1989 The Different Story (World of Lust and Crime) album.

In 1992, Cretu worked with Peter Cornelius on Return to Innocence, to provide the guitar riffs.

For the third album, Cretu teamed up with Jens Gad to work together on Le Roi Est Mort, Vive Le Roi! and launched in 1998 a new trance project Trance Atlantic Air Waves and the album The Energy of Sound.

He owned the A.R.T. Studios in Ibiza before moving to a new mansion in the Ibiza hills. His former house, near Sant Antoni de Portmany on the western coast of Ibiza, was a Moroccan-style mansion that was designed and built by Bernd Steber and Gunter Wagner in more than nine years. It also featured a new recording studio. The Spanish High Court deemed the house to have been built illegally and in infringement of Spanish environmental regulations which led to the €18 million villa being razed in May 2009.

1988–present: Enigma

Cretu was encouraged to pursue a solo project by Oldfield, who was impressed by his studio production skills and musical ideas. This led to the creation of his musical project Enigma, which Cretu said was born from the idea of making music that he himself liked, while bringing in a sense of mysticism. The formation of Enigma involved Fabrice Cuitad, under the alias of David Fairstein, and Frank Peterson. The trio worked together to create their groundbreaking debut single "Sadeness (Part I)", which became a surprise international hit. MCMXC a.D., the album, which was released in 1990, was hugely successful.

Cretu was not surprised by the album's unexpected success, as he recalled telling his wife before its release, "This will be a huge hit or nothing at all". "Cretu's style of mixing a variety of musical genres, samples and sounds was very unusual to the ears of the listening public at the time, and led to him being described as an "alchemist in sound".

The second album, The Cross of Changes, was released in 1993. Peterson had disagreements with Cretu by the time of recording and left the project in 1991. Cretu changed Enigma's direction from Gregorian chants to tribal chants for its second album, culminating in its second international hit single "Return to Innocence".

Cretu purposefully reduced the use of Gregorian chants as numerous artists had started to use them in their music, causing "an avalanche of bad copies", but later regarded it as a compliment.

Cretu was approached by Paramount Pictures to write the soundtrack of the film Sliver and he came up with another 1993 single "Carly's Song" after the main female character's name.

In 1996 Enigma's third album Le Roi est mort, vive le Roi! was released. Stylistically, it sounded like a combination of the first and second albums. It did not achieve the same level of success as them, but sold over 1 million copies in the United States and received a Gold certificate in the United Kingdom nonetheless.

In 1999 Cretu steered the project in another direction by using samples of Carl Orff's Carmina Burana for the fourth album The Screen Behind the Mirror, released in 2000. Andru Donalds and Ruth-Ann Boyle first appeared as features on this Enigma project. Although Jens Gad had been working with Cretu on the earlier albums, this was the first time that he had been given actual credits.

In 2001, Cretu released two Enigma compilation albums: Love Sensuality Devotion: The Greatest Hits and Love Sensuality Devotion: The Remix Collection that include credits to ATB. By this time, Enigma has clocked close to an estimated 30 million sales worldwide.

Cretu continued to record Enigma albums, releasing Voyageur in 2003. Familiar sounds of the Shakuhachi flute, tribal or Gregorian chants were replaced with more commercially-friendly tunes and beat. In March 2006, a new single called "Hello and Welcome" was released in anticipation of another album, A Posteriori.

A Posteriori is the sixth Enigma studio album. It was released on 22 September 2006.

Seven Lives Many Faces is the seventh Enigma studio album. It was released on 19 September 2008.

The Fall of a Rebel Angel was released on 11 November 2016.

Personal life
Cretu married Sandra on 7 January 1988; together they have twin sons who were born in July 1995. They lived in Ibiza, Spain in a home that also housed A.R.T. Studios, where the Enigma albums were recorded. In November 2007, the couple divorced. The Ibiza home was bulldozed after Cretu lost a legal battle in which he did not obtain planning permission to renovate and build on the site. After the divorce, Cretu remarried. He now lives in Munich.

Cretu became known as an artist who kept a low profile, giving few interviews and avoiding concert tours.

Discography

Solo albums
 1979 – Moon, Light & Flowers (re-released in Germany in 1994 as: Ausgewählte Goldstücke)
 1983 – Legionäre (English edition: Legionnaires)
 1985 – Die Chinesische Mauer (English edition: The Invisible Man)

Solo singles
 1978 – "Shadows Over My Head"
 1978 – "Wild River"
 1979 – "Moonlight Flower"
 1979 – "Love Me"
 1983 – "Total Normal"
 1983 – "Zeitlose Reise"
 1983 – "Der Planet der verlorenen Zeit"
 1983 – "Today, Today"
 1984 – "Schwarzer Engel"
 1985 – "Carte Blanche"
 1985 – "Die Chinesische Mauer"
 1985 – "Samurai" (German Version)"
 1985 – "Samurai (Did You Ever Dream)" (English Version) [#3 Austria, No. 2 Switzerland, No. 4 Sweden, No. 1 Greece, No. 4 Italy, No. 12 Germany]
 1985 – "Silver Water"
 1986 – "Gambit"
 1987 – "School's Out" (Cretu & Thiers)
 1987 – "When Love Is the Missing Word" (Cretu & Thiers)
 1988 – "Don't Say You Love Me (Let Me Feel It)" (Cretu & Thiers)
 1988 – "Captain Right" (Cretu & Thiers)
 1992 – "Rettungsringe sterben aus" (Cretu & Peter Cornelius)
 1992 – "Nur die Hoffnung nicht" (Cretu & Peter Cornelius)

Collaborations and productions
 1980 – Topas; "Topas"
 1981 – Peter Kent; "Happy Weekend"
 1982 – Severine
 1983 – Mireille Mathieu; "Ein neuer Morgen"
 1983 – Mary and Gordy
 1983 – Peter Cornelius; "Fata Morgana"
 1984 – Hubert Kah; "Goldene Zeiten"
 1986 – Hubert Kah; Tensongs
 1986 – Avenue; "Imagination"
 1985 – Moti Special; Motivation
 1987 – Mike Oldfield; Islands
 1987 – Inker & Hamilton; Dancing Into Danger
 1987 – Cretu And Thiers; School's Out
 1988 – Cretu And Thiers; Belle Epoque
 1989 – Hubert Kah; "Sound of My Heart"
 1989 – Sylvie Vartan; "Confidanses"
 1989 – Peter Schilling; The Different Story (World of Lust and Crime)
 1992 – Peter Cornelius and Cretu; Peter Cornelius and Cretu
 1993 – Maggie Reilly; "Midnight Sun"
 1996 – Kurt Maloo; The Captain of Her Heart (Michael Cretu Mixes)
 1998 – Trance Atlantic Air Waves; The Energy of Sound
 1999 – Andru Donalds; "Snowin' Under My Skin"
 2001 – Andru Donalds; "Let's Talk About It"
 2007 – Ruth-Ann Boyle; "What About Us"

Sandra
Cretu worked as writer, producer and background vocalist for Sandra's albums:

 1985: The Long Play [#12 Germany, No. 8 Norway, No. 2 Sweden, No. 18 Austria, No. 4 Switzerland]
 1986: Mirrors [#16 Germany, No. 14 Norway, No. 40 Sweden, No. 13 Switzerland]
 1987: Ten on One [#19 Germany, No. 28 Austria, No. 14 Switzerland]
 1988: Into a Secret Land [#14 Germany, No. 18 Norway, No. 22 Sweden, No. 13 Austria, No. 9 Switzerland]
 1988: Everlasting Love
 1990: Paintings in Yellow [#4 Germany No. 30 Sweden, No. 14 Austria, No. 8 Switzerland]
 1992: Close to Seven [#7 Germany, No. 20 Norway, No. 27 Sweden, No. 26 Austria, No. 13 Switzerland]
 1992: 18 Greatest Hits [#10 Germany, No. 7 France, No. 36 Sweden, No. 27 Switzerland No. 1 Finland]
 1995: Fading Shades [#42 Germany, No. 37 Switzerland]
 1999: My Favourites [#16 Germany, No. 15 Norway, No. 43 Switzerland]
 2002: The Wheel of Time [#8 Germany, No. 63 Austria, No. 68 Switzerland]

References

External links

The Official Enigma website (international)

 
 

1957 births
German electronic musicians
German new wave musicians
Romanian electronic musicians
Enigma (German band) members
German people of Austrian descent
German people of Romanian descent
German record producers
Living people
Virgin Records artists
Polydor Records artists
East West Records artists
Musicians from Bucharest
Romanian expatriates in West Germany
Romanian pianists
Romanian Roman Catholics
Romanian emigrants to West Germany
Romanian people of Austrian descent